The 1921 Tulsa Orange and Black football team represented the University of Tulsa during the 1921 college football season. In their third year under head coach Francis Schmidt, the Orange and Black compiled a 6–3 record and outscored their opponents by a total of 257 to 95. Schmidt was later inducted into the College Football Hall of Fame.

Schedule

References

Tulsa
Tulsa Golden Hurricane football seasons
Tulsa Orange and Black football